Ewald Urban (22 July 1913 – 8 January 1959) was a Polish footballer. He played in six matches for the Poland national football team from 1932 to 1934.

References

External links
 

1913 births
1959 deaths
Polish footballers
Poland international footballers
Place of birth missing
Association footballers not categorized by position